Rhoga is a genus of hoverflies, with five known species. All are small, delicate, pale yellowish flies, with distinct black pilose brushes on their metatibiae.  These flies are probably mimics of stingless bees of the  tribe Meliponini.

Biology
Larvae are found in ant nests.

Distribution
They are native to the Neotropics.

Species
R. lutescens Walker, 1857
R. maculata (Shannon, 1927)
R. mellea (Curran, 1940)
R. sepulchrasilva (Hull, 1937)
R. xanthoprosopus Barretto & Lane, 1947

References

Hoverfly genera
Diptera of South America
Microdontinae
Taxa named by Francis Walker (entomologist)